Radioactive substances are materials that emit radiation.

Divisions

Any quantity of packages bearing the RADIOACTIVE YELLOW III label (LSA-III).

Some radioactive materials in "exclusive use" with low specific activity radioactive materials will not bear the label, however, the RADIOACTIVE placard is required.

Placards

Compatibility Table

References

49CFR 173 Subpart I

Radioactive Substances